Derrick Brooks Keith Page (born 24 May 1961) is a Jamaican born former English cricketer.  Page was a right-handed batsman who bowled right-arm fast-medium.  He was born in Trelawny, Cornwall County.

Page made his debut for Shropshire in the 1990 Minor Counties Championship against Dorset.  He played a further match in that season's competition against Buckinghamshire.  He played a single List A match for Shropshire in the 1990 NatWest Trophy against Derbyshire.  He was dismissed for a duck in this game by Alan Warner, while with the ball he bowled 5 wicket-less overs.  Page later joined Staffordshire in 1992, making his debut for the county in the 1992 MCCA Knockout Trophy against Wales Minor Counties.  He played Minor counties cricket in just the 1992 season for Staffordshire, making 6 Minor Counties Championship appearances and 3 MCCA Knockout Trophy appearances.  Additionally, he also made a single List A appearance for the county in the 1992 NatWest Trophy against Warwickshire.  He scored 6 unbeaten runs in the match, while taking the wicket of Andy Moles for the cost of 46 runs from 9 overs.

References

External links
Derrick Page at ESPNcricinfo
Derrick Page at CricketArchive

1961 births
Living people
People from Trelawny Parish
English people of Jamaican descent
English cricketers
Shropshire cricketers
Staffordshire cricketers